Thunderbird Entertainment Group (formerly Thunderbird Films) is a Canadian film and television entertainment company, with offices in both Canada and the United States of America. Thunderbird's multiple divisions develop movies and television programs for various demographics.

Foundation of the company
Thunderbird Entertainment Group was founded as Thunderbird Films in 2003 by Tim Gamble and Michael Shepard.

In February 2012, it was announced that Lionsgate Founder, Frank Giustra, had made a significant investment to become a major shareholder in Thunderbird, and it was announced the company would make significant investment into scripted television.

Corporate acquisitions and major partnerships

Sea to Sky Entertainment
In March 2012, Thunderbird Entertainment announced a new partnership with Lionsgate to form Sea to Sky Entertainment. The announcement came weeks after Frank Giustra became a major shareholder in Thunder Entertainment. Lionsgate and Thunderbird jointly manage the venture, which is designed to share production and distribution costs for all scripted projects picked up to series.

Reunion Pictures
On April 4, 2013, it was announced that Thunderbird Films purchased Reunion Pictures.  Reunion Pictures has since rebranded as Reunion Pacific Entertainment.

Great Pacific Media
Great Pacific Media, Canada's most successful factual production company is a Vancouver-based production company that specializes in financing and the development, production and co-production of documentaries, game shows and reality television. Great Pacific Media was named on Realscreen's Global 100 list of best production companies working in the non-fiction and unscripted visual content industry for the seventh year in a row and is cited as its productions can be seen in more than 170 territories worldwide.

Great Pacific Media was founded by television veterans Blair Reekie and Mark Miller on May 1, 2010. Great Pacific Media was acquired by Thunderbird Entertainment in December 2014 but retains its own distinctive corporate identity.

Miller retained his role as chief executive officer at Great Pacific Media after the acquisition and was subsequently appointed co-president of Thunderbird Entertainment in 2016. In April 2016, it was announced that former Bell Media executive Paul Lewis had joined Great Pacific Media in the role of President. In January 2019, television industry veteran Wendy McKernan was named Vice President of Great Pacific Media.

Great Pacific Media currently produces the Discovery Canada series Highway Thru Hell and Heavy Rescue: 401, both of which also stream globally on Netflix. Other series include Save My Reno and Worst to First, which airs on HGTV, and Queen of the Oil Patch, which aired on Aboriginal Peoples Television Network (APTN).

Thunderbird Releasing
In September 2014, it was announced that Thunderbird Entertainment acquired Thunderbird Releasing. Thunderbird Releasing is a London-based all-rights film distribution company, with a division in Canada, specializing in arthouse, independent and world cinema. Established in 2002 by Eve Gabereau and Edward Fletcher, the company releases 25-plus films a year and has a library of over 300 titles.

Films distributed in the UK and Ireland include, Hirokazu Koreeda's Palme d'Or and Golden Globes-winning film Shoplifters (2018), Sara Colangelo's award-winning drama The Kindergarten Teacher (2019) and may el-Toukhy's Sundance hit Queen of Hearts (2019).

Atomic Cartoons
On July 8, 2015, Thunderbird Entertainment bought the Vancouver-based animation studio Atomic Cartoons. Atomic Cartoons is now referred to as "Thunderbird's Kids and Family Division", though it also retains its own distinctive corporate identity.

Atomic Cartoons was founded in 1999 by Trevor Bentley, Mauro Casalese, Olaf Miller and Rob Davies. Throughout its history, Atomic Cartoons has worked with partners such as Marvel Animation, Netflix, Disney, Cartoon Network, Warner Bros., Lego, Mattel, Spin Master and Nelvana. Atomic's productions include Emmy Award-winning Beat Bugs, the upcoming Netflix series The Last Kids on Earth, the Disney show 101 Dalmatian Street, Counterfeit Cat, Minecraft Mini Series, Marvel's Avengers Assemble, Max & Ruby and LEGO Jurassic World: The Secret Exhibit.

Jennifer Twiner McCarron currently serves as chief executive officer, a role she was appointed to in 2016, after previously serving as Atomic's Head of Development. In 2018, Twiner McCarron was appointed chief executive officer for Thunderbird Entertainment Group, while also retaining the role of CEO at Atomic Cartoons.

In 2019. Mathew Berkowitz was named the company's Chief Creative Officer for both Thunderbird Entertainment and Atomic Cartoons.

In February 2020, the company announced the opening of its third animation studio and first in Burbank, California. The studio will be led by Matthew Berkowitz, the chief creative officer of Thunderbird and Atomic Cartoons. Aaron Behl and Kristin Cummings, co-vice presidents, of Atomic Originals, will also hold senior leadership roles. Atomic now has a capacity for 880 crew members across its three facilities (the other two studios are located in Vancouver, BC and Ottawa, ON).

Global Distribution and Consumer Products Division
In January 2021, Thunderbird announced the creation of a new Global Distribution and Consumer Products Division. Industry veteran Richard Goldsmith joins Thunderbird and Atomic Cartoons, the company's Kids and Family Division, to lead the new venture as President of Global Distribution and Consumer Products.

Initial public offering
Thunderbird Entertainment Group Inc. became a publicly traded company on the TSX Venture Exchange on November 2, 2018. It trades under the symbol (TSXV: TBRD). Thunderbird's Board is composed of Brian Paes-Braga (Executive Chair), Frank Giustra, Tim Gamble, Jennifer Twiner McCarron, Mark Miller, Frank Holmes, Paul Sparkes and Azim Jamal.

On December 16, 2019, the Company appointed Marni Wieshofer as an independent board member and lead director of the board following the company's AGM. Wieshofer previously served as CFO and EVP of corporate development at Lionsgate Entertainment, where she oversaw mergers, acquisitions and other strategic financial initiatives. The move reunites Wieshofer with fellow board member and Lionsgate founder Frank Giustra.

On November 10, 2020, it was announced that Thunderbird Entertainment Group Inc. has qualified to trade on the OTCQX Best Market. Thunderbird Entertainment Group Inc. upgraded to OTCQX from the Pink market.

In February 2021, Thunderbird reported that Linda Michaelson joined the company as an independent member of its board of directors, with the resignation of a current board member, Frank Holmes.

About the logo
The Thunderbird is a mythological creature born from the rich narrative tradition of Canada's First Nations people in the Pacific Northwest. The Thunderbird is often carved at the top of totem poles, which are monuments that traditionally bring communities together to illustrate their stories.

The artwork in the logo which depicts abstract elements of the Thunderbird legend, was commissioned from First Nations artist Corrine Hunt.

Current productions

Kim's Convenience
Thunderbird Entertainment began production on a 13-episode first season of the new half-hour comedy series Kim's Convenience, which premiered on October 11, 2016, on CBC. The series is based on the award-winning play by Ins Choi, who serves as series creator along with Kevin White (Schitts Creek, Corner Gas). Executive Producers on Kim's Convenience are Ivan Fecan, Tim Gamble, Alexandra Raffé, Leslie Lester, Albert Schultz, Ins Choi and Kevin White. Supervising Producers are Sandra Cunningham and Robin Cass. The series stars Paul Sun-Hyung Lee, Jean Yoon, Simu Liu, Andrea Bang, Andrew Phung and Nicole Power. Production on Season 5 has begun as of September 9, 2020, and is set to premiere on CBC TV and CBC Gem in Winter 2021.

Highway Thru Hell
Highway Thru Hell debuted on Discovery Canada on Tuesday, September 4, 2012. It is a factual TV series that follows the operations of a heavy vehicle rescue and recovery towing company; Jamie Davis Motor Trucking, based in Hope, British Columbia. Other companies involved in the series include Quiring Towing, Aggressive Towing and Mission Towing. Highway Thru Hell focuses on the hardships of operating along the highways of the BC Interior, especially the Coquihalla Highway (Coq) and the work it takes to keep some of the most economically important, most travelled, and most inhospitable trucking routes in North America open. The series airs on Discovery Canada, streams globally on Netflix and airs on The Weather Channel in the United States.

Season 9 premiered on Discovery on September 14, 2020.

Save My Reno
This television series is focused on helping homeowners complete renovations to transform their space on a limited budget. This series is hosted by contractor Sebastian Clovis, a former Canadian Football League player and designer, editor and TV personality Samantha Pynn.

The series premiered in 2014 under the title Tackle My Reno, featuring Clovis assisting homeowners with renovations on his own. In 2016,  the show relaunched as Save My Reno, with Clovis and designer Sabrina Smelko hosting the retooled show as a duo. Season 4 premieres on HGTV Canada on Tuesday, March 16, 2021.

Beat Bugs
It was announced in February 2016 that Atomic Cartoons would be a co-producer on the series, which began streaming on Netflix August 3, 2016. The series features original characters and a world created by Australian native Josh Wakely, who directs, writes and produces the series, following a deal with Sony/ATV Music Publishing for worldwide rights to record covers of the Beatles song catalog.

Beat Bugs incorporates songs from the Lennon/McCartney "Northern Songs" catalog. The show will feature some of the best-known Beatles songs woven into the narrative of each episode, with Eddie Vedder, Pink, James Bay, Sia, The Shins, Of Monsters and Men, Chris Cornell, Regina Spektor, and James Corden each recording their rendition of a song. Among the songs featured are "Help!", "All You Need Is Love", "Come Together", "Penny Lane", "Yellow Submarine", "Lucy in the Sky With Diamonds", "Sgt. Pepper's Lonely Hearts Club Band" and "Magical Mystery Tour".

Season three of the series began streaming in November 2018

Queen of the Oil Patch 
Queen of the Oil Patch is a Canadian documentary series that premiered in 2018. It follows the inspirational journey of one man with two spirits – Massey Whiteknife and Iceis Rain – working to break down barriers in the heart of Alberta oil country. Having faced both childhood sexual abuse and bullying as a teenager because he was gay, Whiteknife first created the drag persona of Iceis Rain after being diagnosed with post-traumatic stress disorder. According to Whiteknife, Iceis Rain helped him to become more secure and confident in himself and his business career, and to heal from his childhood emotional traumas.

The series is produced for APTN in collaboration with Kah-Kitowak Films. Season two premiered on June 7, 2020.

Worst to First 
Worst to First is a Canadian lifestyle series that features contractors Sebastian Sevallo and Mickey Fabbiano, as they guide aspiring homeowners through the journey of purchasing and renovating undervalued and outdated homes in the Greater Vancouver area, aiming to transform them from the worst in the neighborhood to the best on the block. For the second season, Catherine Yuen, a Vancouver-based interior designer, was added to the series. It is produced for HGTV Canada.

Heavy Rescue: 401 
Heavy Rescue: 401 is a Canadian factual TV series that premiered on Discovery Canada in October 2016. It was the most-watched premiere in the Discovery network's history. It is an indirect spin-off of Highway Thru Hell. The show focuses on the work of heavy recovery operators in Southern Ontario that work to keep the region's highways clear of wrecks and keep traffic moving. This is no easy task, as these roads are among the busiest in the world, with up to 400,000 vehicles passing through every day. In addition to airing on Discovery Canada, the series also streams globally on Netflix, and airs on The Weather Channel in the United States. Season 5 premiered on Discovery Canada in January 2021. Season 6 is currently in production.

The Last Kids on Earth

On September 26, 2017, it was announced that Thunderbird Entertainment's kids and family division, Atomic Cartoons, had optioned the screen rights on Max Brallier's book series The Last Kids on Earth with the intention of producing an animated television series.

On February 26, 2018, it was announced that Netflix had given the production series order. Executive producers include Brallier, Scott Peterson, Jennifer Twiner McCarron, and Matthew Berkowitz. Brallier and Peterson are also expected to write the series as well. Production companies involved in the series include Thunderbird Entertainment's animation studio Atomic Cartoons.

On March 13, 2019, the series cast was announced, including Mark Hamill, Rosario Dawson, Catherine O'Hara, Keith David, Bruce Campbell, Garland Whitt, Montse Hernandez, Charles Demers, and Nick Wolfhard as the lead character Jack Sullivan.

The series premiered on Netflix in September 2019. Season 2 premiered in April 2020. Season 3 premiered on Netflix in October 2020.

On September 20, 2019, Atomic Cartoons, Cyber Group Studios and Outright Games announced a new partnership to produce The Last Kids on Earth video game.  The game is anticipated to launch in 2021 on consoles and PC.

In November 2020, it was announced that The Last Kids on Earth is coming for gamers early next year when The Last Kids on Earth and the Staff of Doom releases for PlayStation 4, Xbox One, Nintendo Switch, and PC in Spring 2021. The game is a collaboration between Outright Games, Atomic Cartoons, Stage Clear Studios, and Cyber Group Studios.

High Arctic Haulers
A series called High Arctic Haulers for CBC Television premiered in January 2020.  The series examines Canada's resilient northern communities, and the determined men and women who help provide their lifeline to the outside world. These groups are linked together by the summer sealift, when ships loaded with critical cargo travel each year to the farthest reaches of the north to deliver food, clothing, supplies and vital pieces of infrastructure.

Mighty Express 
Netflix has picked up Spin Master Entertainment's new CG-animated series Mighty Express. The 52 x 11-minute series will debut globally (excluding Canada) on the SVOD in September 2020. The animation will be provided by Atomic Cartoons. February 2021 marked the release of season 2 of Mighty Express which saw its next batch of episodes drop on Netflix globally on February 2.

Mud Mountain Haulers
In July 2020, Thunderbird announced production was underway on a new original factual series and the second spin-off of the global hit Highway Thru Hell franchise for Discovery. The new series, featuring Lebeau Brothers Logging, sheds light on the log hauling industry and premiered on Discovery Canada in January 2021. The series is executive produced by Mark Miller.

Upcoming productions

Princess Power
In 2018, it was announced that Thunderbird's kids and family division, Atomic Cartoons, had acquired the IP for Savannah Guthrie and Alison Oppenhiem's New York Times bestselling book series, Princesses Wear Pants. They are currently in development on an animated TV series titled Princess Power, in collaboration with Drew Barrymore's Flower Films which will be released on January 30, 2023.

Eerie
In 2018, Atomic Cartoons announced a second collaboration with the bestselling author Max Brallier, based on his book series for young adults, Eerie Elementary. The series will include live-action and feature animated elements. This is the second collaboration between Atomic Cartoons and Brallier, with the first being The Last Kids on Earth, currently in development for Netflix.

The Marrow Thieves
In 2019. Thunderbird confirmed that author Cherie Dimaline will work with TV writer and producer Jennica Harper to adapt Dimaline's award-winning novel, The Marrow Thieves, for television.

The Teenager and the Lost Mayan City 
The Teenager and the Lost Mayan City is an episode currently in production for the CBC documentary series, The Nature of Things. It will follow the journey of teenager William Gadoury, who in May 2016 made headlines around the world when he announced he'd discovered the location of a lost Mayan city using NASA satellite images and an ancient Mayan map of the stars. Although currently in production, an air date for the episode is not currently known.

Nate Create
Atomic Cartoons, is partnering with the Jim Henson Company to develop a new animated series called Nate Create. The animated series is created by Alex Rockwell (Norman Picklestripes, Word Party), who also executive produces alongside Lisa Henson and Halle Stanford for the Jim Henson Company, and Jennifer Twiner McCarron and Matthew Berkowitz for Atomic Cartoons. Henson is working on the 52 x 11-minute preschool series with Atomic Cartoons, which is co-developing and co-producing the project out of its Vancouver studio and will feature a variety of art styles like origami, watercolor, 2D, cut-out, stop-motion and CG.

What If 
Great Pacific Media, the factual division of Thunderbird Entertainment Group, is in development on its first scripted project – a premium drama series about Nazi scientist Wernher Von Braun and his role in the US space program. Thunderbird's president Mark Miller will executive produce on behalf of Great Pacific Media. Thunderbird and Miller acquired the IP from the Smithsonian Institution last year.

Von Braun: Dreamer of Space, Engineer of War 
Great Pacific Media, the factual division of Thunderbird Entertainment Group, is in development on its first scripted project – a premium drama series about Nazi scientist Wernher Von Braun and his role in the US space program. Thunderbird's president Mark Miller will executive produce on behalf of Great Pacific Media. Thunderbird and Miller acquired the IP from the Smithsonian Institution last year.

Recent and Past productions

Lego Star Wars Holiday Special for Disney+ 
In August 2020, it was announced that Disney+ would be premiering a one-off Star Wars Lego animation. The Lego Star Wars Special will premiere exclusively on Disney+ on November 17, 2020. Produced by Vancouver-based Atomic Cartoons (Thunderbird's Kids and Family Division), the Lego Group and Lucasfilm, it is being directed by Ken Cunningham and written by David Shayne, who is also a co-executive producer.

Somewhere Between 
Thunderbird Entertainment commenced production on a 10-episode first season of the new drama-thriller Somewhere Between in March 2017. The series aired on ABC in 2017 and was written by Stephen Tolkin. Tolkin executive produced the series with Thunderbird's Executive Chair of the Board Ivan Fecan and Joseph Broido.

Blade Runner 2049
Thunderbird Entertainment owns a 50 percent stake in the Blade Runner franchise and was an active partner in the production of Blade Runner 2049. On August 18, 2011, it was announced that Ridley Scott had signed on to direct and produce the new instalment of Blade Runner.

On February 27, 2015, it was announced that Canadian Director Denis Villeneuve would be directing the sequel, and on February 28, 2015, it was confirmed that Harrison Ford will reprise his role as Rick Deckard. On May 21, 2015, award-winning Cinematographer Roger Deakins joined the Blade Runner sequel.

In addition to Ford, the film starred Ryan Gosling. Other cast members include Robin Wright, Dave Bautista, Jared Leto, Ana de Armas, Sylvia Hoeks, Carla Juri and Mackenzie Davis. Tim Gamble and Frank Giustra served as Executive Producers on behalf of Thunderbird Entertainment. The film was released in 2017.

Package Deal
On May 29, 2012, CityTV's original content team announced that it had commissioned Package Deal, a new comedy series produced by Thunderbird Entertainment and created by Andrew Orenstein (Malcolm in the Middle, 3rd Rock from the Sun). Package Deal was a 13-episode, half-hour, multi-camera original comedy about three overly close brothers and the woman who comes between them. On April 1, 2013, it was announced that Package Deal would begin airing on the CityTV network starting Monday, May 6, 2013, at 8:30 pm PST. The second season premiered on CityTV on September 12, 2014, and on April 20, 2015, it was announced by Thunderbird that the sitcom would be made available to stream in the US on Hulu. Package Deal stars Randal Edwards, Harland Williams, Jay Malone, Julia Voth and Jill Morrison.

Mr. Young
Thunderbird Entertainment and Corus Entertainment commenced production on a 26-episode first season of the comedy series Mr. Young in October 2010. The series was created by Dan Signer (The Suite Life on Deck, A.N.T. Farm), and stars Brendan Meyer, Matreya Fedor and Gig Morton. Mr. Young centers on child prodigy Adam Young (Brendan Meyer), who graduated from university at the age of 14. He decides to come back to high school to live the high school experience, only he becomes the science teacher at the school. With one-foot in the lunchroom and the other foot in the staff room, it's Mr. Young's social life that's being put to the test.
On April 29, 2011 Mr. Young was renewed for a 26-episode second season. The series was renewed for a third season in April 2012. Thunderbird began production of a 28-episode third season on May 10, 2012. The show ended its run-on November 28, 2013, with three seasons and 80 episodes. Mr. Young was broadcast on YTV in Canada and Disney XD in the United States. Now is it available to stream on Netflix, also on Nelvana's Keep It Weird YouTube channel.

Some Assembly Required
Thunderbird Entertainment and Corus Entertainment commenced production on a 26-episode first season of the comedy series Some Assembly Required, which premiered on YTV on January 6, 2014. The series was created by Dan Signer (The Suite Life on Deck, A.N.T. Farm), and Howard Nemetz (Mr. Young, The Suite Life of Zack & Cody) and stars Kolton Stewart, Charlie Storwick and Harrison Houde. Some Assembly Required tells the story of Jarvis Raines (Kolton Stewart), an average teenager who becomes boss overnight after he sues a toy company over a defective chemistry set that blows up his house. Jarvis' first act as CEO of Knickknack Toys is to recruit a group of kids from his high school to help him run the company.

On January 5, 2015, Some Assembly Required returned to YTV for an 18-episode second season. The series was renewed for a third season in August 2015 and began production of 13 new episodes that same month. Some Assembly Required is broadcast on YTV in Canada, and on February 25, 2015, it was announced that Netflix acquired season one, which began streaming worldwide outside of Canada on June 19, 2015. On October 16, 2015, Netflix began streaming season two of the series. The 3rd season of "Some Assembly Required" aired a 13-episode season on March 14, and its series finale aired on YTV June 6, 2016, in Canada.

Endgame
Endgame is a Drama Series that was developed and produced by Thunderbird Entertainment. The series premiered on Showcase Television network on Monday, March 14, 2011. In the US, Endgame was broadcast exclusively on Hulu. The series follows former World Chess Champion Arkady Balagan, a genius who uses his analytical skills to solve crimes. Endgame stars Shawn Doyle (Big Love, 24) as Arkady Balagan and features Patrick Gallagher (Glee), Torrance Coombs (Heartland), Katharine Isabelle (Da Vinci's Inquest, Supernatural) and Carmen Aguirre (The L Word).

Awards

Kim's Convenience
For the 5th Canadian Screen Awards in 2017, Kim's Convenience garnered 11 nominations, including Best Comedy Series, Best Actor in a Comedy Series (Lee), Best Actress in a Comedy Series (Yoon and Bang), and Best Supporting Actor in a Comedy Series (Phung). Lee won the award for best actor in a continuing leading comedic role for his portrayal of Appa, and Phung won Best Supporting Actor for his portrayal of Kimchee.

Kim's Convenience won two awards at the 2017 Toronto ACTRA Awards, Outstanding Performance – Female for actress Jean Yoon and the Members’ Choice Series Ensemble Award for Best Cast.

The first-season episodes "Ddong Chim" and "Janet's Photos" are 2017 Writers Guild of Canada's Canadian Screenwriting Awards finalists in the TV comedy category.

At the 6th Canadian Screen Awards in 2018, the series received 12 nominations. It won the awards for Best Comedy Series, Best Actor in a Comedy Series (Lee) and Best Supporting Actor in a Comedy Series (Phung).

At the 2019 Canadian Screen Awards, the series was not eligible to be nominated because its broadcast slot moved from fall to winter. Case member Andrew Phung, however, was nominated for the Cogeco Fund Audience Choice Award, for his portrayal of Kimchee on the popular series.

In July 2020, it was announced that Kim's Convenience won three Leo Awards, including:

 “Best Music, Comedy or Variety Program or Series”
 “Best Direction in a Music, Comedy or Variety Program or Series”
 “Best Performance or Host in a Music, Comedy or Variety Program or Series”

Beat Bugs
The program received an AWGIE Award in animation for an episode script in 2016, an AACTA Award for Best Children's Television Series and a Daytime Emmy Award in 2017.

At the 2019 Daytime Emmy Awards, the Beat Bugs series won for Outstanding Sound Mixing in a Preschool Animated Program.

Canada's 100 Most Powerful Women 
In November 2019, CEO Jennifer Twiner McCarron was named by the Women's Executive Network (WXN) as one of Canada's 100 Most Powerful Women. Presented in partnership with KPMG, the list of Top 100 Winners pays tribute to the outstanding women across Canada who advocate for diversity in the workforce and seek to inspire the next generation of leaders.

Fast Company's 2020 List of the World's Most Innovative Companies 
On March 10, 2020, Thunderbird was named to Fast Company's prestigious annual list of the World's Most Innovative Companies for 2020.  The Company earned the standing of #9 in the Film and Television category.

Molly of Denali 
In June 2020, Molly of Denali was awarded a George Foster Peabody Award for excellence in broadcasting in 2019.

In September 2020, Molly of Denali was presented with the 2020 Television Critics Association award for "Outstanding Achievement in Youth Programming" during the 2019 season.

In February 2021, WGBH, Atomic Cartoons and PBS KIDS won a Kidscreen Award with Molly of Denali in the inaugural Best Inclusivity category.

The Last Kids on Earth
In July 2020, The Last Kids on Earth, produced by Atomic Cartoons, won the Emmy Award for Special Class Animated Program.

In July 2020, it was also announced that The Last Kids on Earth won four Leo Awards including:

 “Best Animation Program or Series”
 “Best Direction, Animation Program or Series”
 “Best Art Direction, Animation Program or Series”
 “Best Musical Score, Animation Program or Series”

Highway Thru Hell 
In July 2020, it was announced that Highway Thru Hell won a Leo Award for "Best Musical Score in a Documentary Series".

Worst to First 
In July 2020, it was announced that Worst to First won a Leo Award for "Best Host(s) in an Information, Lifestyle or Reality Series".

Shows

Scripted TV series
 Kim's Convenience
 Cold Squad
 Da Vinci's City Hall
 Da Vinci's Inquest
 Endgame
 Guilt
 Hiccups
 Mr. Young
 Package Deal
 Stone Undercover
 Some Assembly Required
 Somewhere Between

Factual TV series 

 Airshow
 Game of Homes
 Untold Stories of the ER
 Daily Planet - Segments
 Megaroof: Rebuilding BC Place
 Air Dogs
 The Mistress
 Monster Quake: Japan
 Monster Quake: Chile
 Model Killers
 Scared of my Shadow
 Peak to Peak
 The Last 10 Pounds Bootcamp
 Industrious
 Heroines
 Confessions: Animal Hoarding
 Campus Vets
 Bulging Brides
 Animal Miracles with Alan Thicke
 Makeover Wish
 Prisoners of Age
 Miss Landmine
 Raising Big Blue
 1800 Seconds: Chasing Canada's Snowbirds
 My Evil Sister

Animated series
Beat Bugs
The Last Kids on Earth
101 Dalmatian Street
Minecraft Mini-Series
Marvel's Avengers Assemble
Max & Ruby
Lego Jurassic World: The Secret Exhibit
Super Dinosaur
Ella the Elephant
Johnny Test
Maya the Bee
Transformers: Rescue Bots
Rocket Monkeys
Little Charmers
Mixels
Nico Can Dance!
Pirate Express
Spider-Man Unlimited
Zigby
Zixx
Milo vs ALEX!
World of Quest

References

External links
 
 Great Pacific Television
 Thunderbird Productions

Television production companies of Canada
Companies based in Vancouver
2003 establishments in British Columbia
Canadian companies established in 2003
Mass media companies established in 2003